The Shrine of St. Patrick's Bell is a bell shrine reliquary completed c. 1094–1105 in County Armagh, Ireland, to contain a c. 500 iron hand-bell traditionally associated with the Irish patron saint Saint Patrick (d. 5th-century). Inscriptions on the back of the shrine record that it was commissioned after 1091 by the Uí Néill High King Domnall Ua Lochlainn and completed c. 1105 by the metalworker Cú Dúilig, about whom nothing is known. Both objects are historically significant, with the bell being one of the few Irish very-early medieval artifacts with a continuous provenance lasting from around the 8th century to the present, and the shrine being a highpoint of Irish metalwork from the late Insular and early Romanesque periods.

The hand-bell is made from iron lined with bronze, while its slightly larger shrine is made from bronze, silver and gold and is trapezoidal and sloping in shape, mimicking the form of the bell it was designed to enclose. The shrine's front is minutely decorated having once held thirty gilded filigree panels organised in complex arrays, although some are now lost. Its short-sides contain pairs of openwork panels showing elongated beasts intertwined with ribbon-bodied snakes. The bell was enshrined during a period when many older reliquaries were being preserved or protected with metal encasings; see also Cumdachs (metal containers for Early Medieval Irish manuscripts).

Both objects were kept together for centuries by their hereditary keepers until acquired by the Irish state in the late-19th century. Today both are on permanent display in the Treasury room of the archaeology branch of the National Museum of Ireland (NMI) in Dublin. An early 20th century copy is in the Metropolitan Museum of Art, in New York.

Providence
Both the bell and shrine were held for centuries by their hereditary keepers the Ó Maellchallain family. The objects had been for a period buried in the their garden until the early 19th century, when the last member of the family, a cleric, asked Adam McLean, a merchant from Belfast, to dig them up. They soon after passed into the possession of antiquarians. The bell and shrine were eventually acquired by the Royal Irish Academy for £500, and passed into the collection of the National Museum of Ireland in the late 19th century.

Description

Bell

Bronze hand-bells (Irish: clog) are one of the most numerous surviving forms of early medieval relics in Ireland, and were typically passed between successive generations of abbots and clerics. St. Patrick's bell is one of the most well-known and one of the few Irish objects whose provenance can be traced back 1400 years; it dates from c. 500, although its tongue may be a later addition. Earlier known as the "Clog-Phadruig", "Clog an Edachta", or the "Bell of Armagh", it is thought to have once belonged to the Irish patron saint Patrick, and to have been buried with him — the Annals of Ulster record that in 552 Colmcille recovered three relics from Patrick's grave. There are presumed to have been either his chalice, manuscript, staff and his bell. Legendarily, an angel asked Columcille to donate the cup to County Down and the bell to Armagh.

It is formed from of two sheets of iron which were hammered into shape and joined with rivets. The bell was coated by dipping the iron onto melted bronze. It has a curved crest which holds a separately cast handle.

An early "Life of Patrick", the bilingual Vita tripartita Sancti Patricii, details several stories mentioning bell-relics associated with Patrick. A number recall his battle on Croagh Patrick and draw influence from the Collectanea where his "anger grew against [the blackbirds]. He strikes his bell, so that the men of Ireland heard its voice, and he flung it at them so its gap out of it and that [bell] is Brigit's Gapling".

Shrine
Saint's hand-bells were sometimes enshrined to give prestige to their owner. They were highly prized in the 10th and 11th centuries, although only some 15 survive. It is probable that the shrines were also used for swearing loyalty or legal oaths, and at times may have acted as battle standards. St. Patrick's bell was enshrined c. 1100 by the High King of Ireland Domnall Ua Lochlainn (reigned 1094—1121 AD), and the bishop of Armagh. The shrine is made from four trapezoidal plates joined at the corners by tubes, and further secured by a top-cap and a sliding base plate. Its front is split between an upper crest and main body, and is decorated by a series of plates containing complex openwork designs and geometric cross-patterns.

Crest and front

The top of the crest is lined with a hollow gilt bronze cap with extended wings terminating in animal heads. Its mid-portion conations the heads of two confronted birds in profile with raised wings. The center of its main section contains a large blue glass boss (or stud) holding a cloisonné (held in place by strips of wire) insert. The center of the panel to the right is decorated with zoomorphic interlace, while the center of the insert to the right is now empty.

The main body is built from a grid of sliver gilt panels holding a number of smaller inserts. The larger panels are divided into quadrilaterals set in  a cross shape. This section once held thirty panels of gold filigree and zoomorphic interlace, although a number of these have been damaged or lost and are now either replaced with coloured stones or empty. The positioning and intricacy of the individual panels indicates that the shrine was modeled in advance on a flat surface with a compass and T-square, achieving equal ratios and measures of mathematical distance, proportion, volume and line.

Sides and reverse

Both of the shrine's short-sides contain a pair of openwork silver and gilt panels filled with interlace and separated vertically by an openwork frame. They each have a perforated cube and rings that were once used to attach carrying chains (lost since the 19th century), while the base plate is loose and could be slid open so as to remove the bell.

The reverse is in the same shape as the front plate, but does not contain the bilateral symmetry characteristic of the front and sides, and lacks the "circle and cross" patterns prevalent on the front. It's body comprises an openwork silver plate containing diagonal rows of interlocking patterns arranged in patterns and colouring similar those on the backs of the 11th century portions of the Soiscél Molaisse and the Cathach. The crest on the back is also decorated, but is plainer and in lower relief than the front. The shrine is the only extant bell-relic associated with Patrick, out of the few mentioned in various pre-1200 AD texts and accounts. Two of these now lost shrines were named the "Bernàn" (the gapped bell), and "the Findfaidech" (the sweet-sounding bell, mentioned before 947).

Inscriptions
The shrine's backplate contains inscriptions running continuously round the edge. They are interpreted as recording the names of Ua Lochlainn, who commissioned the work, its keeper Cathalan Ua Maelchallain (Bishop of Armagh from 1091 to 1105), and its craftsman Cú Dúilig and his sons.

The inscriptions read:
OR DO DOMNALL U LACHLAIND LASINDERN  AD IN CLOCSA / OCUS DO DOMNALL CHOMARBA PHATRAIC ICONDER NAD OCUS DOD CHATHALAN U MAELCHALLAND DO MAER IN CH LUIC / OCUS DO CHONDULIG U INMAINEN CONA MACCAIB ROCUMTAIG ("Pray for Domnall Ua Lochlainn for whom was made this bell, and for Domnall, coarb of Patrick, in whose house (it) was made, and for Cathalan ua M?el Challand, for the keeper of this bell, and for C? D?ilig Ua Inmainen, with his sons, (who) enshrined it").

References

Sources

 Bourke, Cormac. The Early Medieval Hand-bells of Ireland and Britain. Dublin: Wordwell, 2022. 
 Crawford, Henry. "A Descriptive List of Irish Shrines and Reliquaries. Part I". Journal of the Royal Society of Antiquaries of Ireland, sixth series, volume 13, No. 1, 30 June 1923. 
 De Paor, Liam. "The Christian Triump: The Golden Age". In: Treasures of Early Irish Art, 1500 B.C. to 1500 A.D.. NY: Metropolitan Museum of Art, 1977. 
 Erskine, Sarah. "Is the Cloc ind Édachta St Patrick's oldest and most important medieval bell-relic?". Journal of the Royal Society of Antiquaries of Ireland, volume 142/143, 2012. 
Lovett, Richard. "Shrine of St. Patrick's Bell - Irish Pictures". Religious Tract Society, 1888
 Moss, Rachel. Medieval c. 400—c. 1600: Art and Architecture of Ireland. London: Yale University Press, 2014. 
 Ó Floinn, Raghnal; Wallace, Patrick. Treasures of the National Museum of Ireland: Irish Antiquities. Dublin: National Museum of Ireland, 2002. 
 Overbey, Karen. Sacral Geographies: Saints, Shrines and Territory in Medieval Ireland. Turnhout: Brepols, 2012. 
 Mitchell, Perette. "The Inscriptions on Pre-Norman Irish Reliquaries". Proceedings of the Royal Irish Academy: Archaeology, Culture, History, Literature, volume 96C, no. 1, 1996. 
 Reeves, William. "On the Bell of St. Patrick, called the Clog an Edachta". The Transactions of the Royal Irish Academy, volume 27, 1877. 
 Stevick, Robert. "St Patrick's Bell Shrine: Form and Layout of the Plates". Journal of the Royal Society of Antiquaries of Ireland volume 138, 2008. 

Bell-shrines
Collection of the National Museum of Ireland
Saint Patrick